Vince or Vincent Martin may refer to:
Vince Martin (actor) (born 1955), Australian actor
Vince Martin (politician) (1920–2001), Australian politician
Vince Martin (singer) (1937–2018), American folk singer
Vincent Martin (born 1960), birth name of Vince Clarke, English musician, songwriter, member of Erasure
Vincent Martin (rugby union) (born 1992), French rugby union player
Vincent A. Martin (1870–1951), member of the Michigan Senate
Vincent P. Martin (born 1968), Irish politician
Rhyging (1924–1948), Jamaican criminal whose real name was Vincent Martin